Sven Arne Runeberg (7 April 1912 — 15 November 1979) was a Finnish anthropologist and linguist, best known for his studies on magic, witchcraft, and sociolinguistics.

Arne Runeberg was born in Helsinki into the Swedish-speaking cultural family Runeberg; his great grandfather was Finland's national poet J. L. Runeberg. Arne Runeberg attained his B.A. degree at the University of Helsinki in 1939, but World War II made a stop to his postgraduate studies. In 1947, however, he was the first student to defend his doctoral thesis, Witches, Demons and Fertility Magic, at the new Faculty of Social Sciences in Helsinki University.

Representing evolutionary anthropology, Arne Runeberg was trained by two students of Edvard Westermarck, namely Gunnar Landtman and Rafael Karsten.

After his doctoral degree, Arne Runeberg had a versatile career at several colleges in Denmark, Sweden, the United Kingdom, including London School of Economics (1961) and Umeå Social College (1964–1971). The last tenure was at his alma mater, as he was appointed the associate professor of social anthropology in Helsinki (1971–1979).

In addition to his doctoral thesis, Arne Runeberg wrote two substantial studies: Jesu korsfästelse i religionshistorisk belysning (1952) situates Jesus Christ in a long tradition of so-called carnival kings, and Some Observations on Linguistic Patterns in a Bilingual Society (1951–1954) discusses bilinguality. Runeberg himself was a bilingual Finn par excellence, using both Swedish and Finnish.

Arne Runeberg died in Helsinki, aged 67, soon after he was retired from the University.

Writings
Kortfattad finsk ordböjningslära (1945)
Witches, Demons and Fertility Magic: Analysis of Their Significance and Mutual Relations in West-European Folk Religion (1947)
Some Observations on Linguistic Patterns in a Bilingual Society I–II (1951–1954) 
Jesu korsfästelse i religionshistorisk belysning (1952)
Pikku Oppikirja (1954)
Kortfattad finsk satslära (1954)
 Finsk grammatik för mellanskolan 1–2 (1957)

Sources
 
 Runeberg, Arne in Uppslagsverket Finland (in Swedish).

1912 births
1979 deaths
Academic staff of the University of Helsinki
Finnish sociologists
Linguists from Finland
Social anthropologists
Cultural anthropologists
Anthropologists of religion
20th-century anthropologists
Finnish expatriates in Denmark
Finnish expatriates in Sweden
Finnish expatriates in the United Kingdom
20th-century linguists